Chargeurs Réunis (United Shippers) is a major French company formed in 1872. It is now known as Chargeurs.

Profile and management
Chargeurs is a global, diversified group with leadership positions in niche markets, both in manufacturing and in services.
It operates in three business segments:
 Temporary surface protection, through Chargeurs Protective Films
 Technical textiles, through Chargeurs Interlining
 Topmaking and combed wool sales, through Chargeurs Wool.
In 2012, consolidated revenue totaled €524.6 million, of which 94% was generated outside France.
With operations in 33 countries on five continents, the Group has more than 1,800 employees.

Eduardo Malone is Chairman and Chief Executive Officer. The executive committee also includes Martine Odillard, Chief Operating Officer, Laurent Derolez, Managing Director of Chargeurs Protective Films, Federico Paullier, Managing Director of Chargeurs Wool, and Stéphane Rigaut, Managing Director of Chargeurs Interlining.

History

Chargeurs was formed in 1872 as a shipping company, named Compagnie Maritime des Chargeurs Réunis ('CMCR'), initially operating between Le Havre and the River Plate. In 1883 it took over the Société Postale de l'Atlantique and started a service to West Africa. In 1894 it took over Compagnie Commerciale des Transports à Vapeur Français, giving it that company's services to New Orleans and the Gulf of Mexico.

Chargeurs operated a route to Madagascar via South Africa from 1896 to 1905, and then a round the World route from 1905 to 1911. From 1901 the company ran a route from Dunkirk to Saigon and Haiphong. From 1928 to 1931 it ran an emigrant route for the Polish government from Gdynia to Brazil and Argentina. In 1929 it started running banana boats from Africa to France. In 1946 it started a cargo service between Dakar and the United States. Chargeurs discontinued passenger services after the independence of Indochina from France in the early 1950s and the increase in air travel.
 
Chargeurs was a shareholder in British Satellite Broadcasting, the official UK satellite broadcaster. BSB was set up in 1986 in competition with Rupert Murdoch's Sky Television. Sky was launched in 1989, a year earlier than BSB. Both companies suffered massive losses and BSB collapsed. This allowed a merger on Murdoch's terms to form British Sky Broadcasting. Chargeurs maintained a minority shareholding.

In 1992, Chargeurs bought media group Pathé for 1.2 billion francs. 
Chargeurs demerged Pathé in 1996: Chargeurs became an industrial group with textile activities and protective films business, whereas Pathé SA retained the media interests: the film, television, cinema chain and the shareholdings in pay TV operators British Sky Broadcasting (BSkyB) and CanalSatellite.

Current structure

The company's three units are:
Chargeurs Protective Films, which offers temporary surface protection 
Chargeurs Interlining, which manufactures technical textiles 
Chargeurs Wool, which provides raw material processing

References

Links

Conglomerate companies established in 1872
Companies listed on Euronext Paris
Textile companies of France
Shipping companies of France